Rise Heart is the second live album of Filipino worship band Victory Worship. It is the follow-up to its gold-selling debut release, "Radical Love".

Radio singles
Three songs from "Rise Heart" were released to local Christian radio for airplay. The carrier single was "Dance in Freedom", written and sung by Yan Asuncion, who co-wrote Victory Worship's debut single, "Radical Love". The second single released to radio was "Reign Forever", sung by Cathy Go, lead vocalist on "Radical Love". The third and final single released to radio was "My God", sung by Joseph Ramos.

Official music videos
Live performance videos were released on YouTube for six songs from "Rise Heart." In addition to videos for radio singles "Dance in Freedom" and "Reign Forever", videos were released for "Rise Heart", "Everlasting Glory", "Lay It Down", and "Lost Without You".

Reception
"Rise Heart" was released on digital and CD formats on October 20, 2015. The Philippine Star music columnist Baby Gil wrote, "("Rise Heart") is just as well-made (as "Radical Love") and I do love the attention to detail that the producers also gave this album". On February 11, 2016, the Philippine Association of the Record Industry awarded "Rise Heart" a gold certification in recognition of sales of over 7,500 copies. This was the band's second consecutive gold certification.

Track listing

Certifications

References

2015 live albums
Christian music albums by Filipino artists